The COVID-19 pandemic in Guinea is part of the worldwide pandemic of coronavirus disease 2019 caused by severe acute respiratory syndrome coronavirus 2. The virus was confirmed to have reached Guinea in March 2020.



Background 
On 12 January 2020, the World Health Organization (WHO) confirmed that a novel coronavirus was the cause of a respiratory illness in a cluster of people in Wuhan City, Hubei Province, China, which was reported to the WHO on 31 December 2019.

The case fatality ratio for COVID-19 has been much lower than SARS of 2003, but the transmission has been significantly greater, with a significant total death toll. Model-based simulations for Guinea suggest that the 95% confidence interval for the time-varying reproduction number R t has been lower than 1.0 since July 2021.

Timeline

March 2020
 On 13 March 2020, Guinea's first confirmed COVID-19 case was reported. A Belgian national who is an employee of the European Union delegation in Guinea has tested positive for COVID-19.
 Confirmed cases doubled from eight to 16 on 29 March.

April to June 2020
 There were 1,479 new cases in April, raising the total number of confirmed cases to 1495. The death toll was 7. There were 329 recoveries, leaving 1,159 active cases at the end of the month.
 In May 2020, six people were killed by police at checkpoints in Coyah and Dubréka. Police spokesman Mory Kaba claimed that the individuals were protesting the checkpoints, which had been established to control the spread of COVID-19. Protesters stated that they were protesting extortion at the checkpoints. During the month there were 2,276 new cases, raising the total number of cases to 3,771. The death toll rose to 23. At the end of the month there were 1,653 active cases.
 Médecins Sans Frontières (MSF) sent help for Guinea's efforts at combatting the virus.
 There were 1,620 new cases in June, bringing the total number of cases to 5,391. The death toll rose to 33. There were 1,032 active cases at the end of the month.

July to September 2020
 During July there were 1,917 new cases, raising the total number of cases to 7,308. The death toll rose by thirteen to 46. The number of recovered patients reached 6,458, leaving 804 active patients at the end of the month (22% less than at the end of June).
 There were 2,101 new cases in August, raising the total number of cases to 9,409. The death toll increased by thirteen of 59. There were 903 active cases at the end of the month, representing an increase of 12% from the end of July.
 There were 1,225 new cases in September, bringing the total number of confirmed cases to 10,634. The death toll rose to 66. The number of recovered patients increased to 9,960, leaving 608 active cases at the end of the month.

October to December 2020
 There were 1,438 new cases in October, bringing the total number of confirmed cases to 12,072. The death toll rose to 72. The number of recovered patients increased to 10,550, leaving 1450 active cases at the end of the month.
 There were 1,047 new cases in November, bringing the total number of confirmed cases to 13,119. The death toll rose to 76. The number of recovered patients increased to 12,045, leaving 998 active cases at the end of the month.
 There were 603 new cases in December, taking the total number of confirmed cases to 13,722. The death toll rose to 81. The number of recovered patients increased to 13,141, leaving 500 active cases at the end of the month.

January to March 2021
 Guinea received a small number of doses of the Sputnik V vaccine and became the first country in sub-Saharan Africa to inoculate some of its high-level officials. There were 824 new cases in January, taking the total number of confirmed cases to 14,546. The death toll rose to 82. The number of recovered patients increased to 14,208, leaving 256 active cases at the end of the month.
 There were 1446 new cases in February, taking the total number of confirmed cases to 15,992. The death toll rose to 89. The number of recovered patients increased to 14,897, leaving 1006 active cases at the end of the month.
 There were 4091 new cases in March, taking the total number of confirmed cases to 20,083. The death toll rose to 127. The number of recovered patients increased to 16,754, leaving 3202 active cases at the end of the month.

April to June 2021
 194,400 doses of the Oxford-AstraZeneca COVID-19 vaccine were delivered on 11 April, courtesy of COVAX.
 There were 2132 new cases in April, taking the total number of confirmed cases to 22,215. The death toll rose to 144. The number of recovered patients increased to 19,670, leaving 2401 active cases at the end of the month.
 There were 962 new cases in May, taking the total number of confirmed cases to 23,177. The death toll rose to 161. The number of recovered patients increased to 20,974, leaving 2042 active cases at the end of the month.
 There were 576 new cases in June, taking the total number of confirmed cases to 23,753. The death toll rose to 169. The number of recovered patients increased to 22,443, leaving 1141 active cases at the end of the month.

July to September 2021
 There were 2161 new cases in July, taking the total number of confirmed cases to 25,914. The death toll rose to 232. The number of recovered patients increased to 24,327, leaving 1355 active cases at the end of the month.
 There were 3627 new cases in August, raising the total number of confirmed cases to 29,541. The death toll rose to 338. The number of recovered patients increased to 27,357, leaving 1846 active cases at the end of the month.
 There were 879 new cases in September, raising the total number of confirmed cases to 30,420. The death toll rose to 379. The number of recovered patients increased to 28,877, leaving 1164 active cases at the end of the month.

October to December 2021
 There were 233 new cases in October, bringing the total number of confirmed cases to 30,653. The death toll rose to 385. The number of recovered patients increased to 29,516, leaving 752 active cases at the end of the month.
 There were 117 new cases in November, bringing the total number of confirmed cases to 30,770. The death toll rose to 387. The number of recovered patients increased to 29,725, leaving 658 active cases at the end of the month.
 There were 1,901 new cases in December, raising the total number of confirmed cases to 32,671. The death toll rose to 391. The number of recovered patients increased to 29,922, leaving 2,358 active cases at the end of the month. Modeling by WHO’s Regional Office for Africa suggests that due to under-reporting, the true cumulative number of infections by the end of 2021 was around 5.9 million while the true number of COVID-19 deaths was around 2,800.

January to March 2022
 There were 3,399 new cases in January, raising the total number of confirmed cases to 36,070. The death toll rose to 419. The number of recovered patients increased to 32,037, leaving 3,614 active cases at the end of the month.
 There were 327 new cases in February, bringing the total number of confirmed cases to 36,397. The death toll rose to 440. The number of recovered patients increased to 32,939, leaving 3,018 active cases at the end of the month.
 There were 62 new cases in March, bringing the total number of confirmed cases to 36,459. The death toll remained unchanged. The number of recovered patients increased to 35,976, leaving 43 active cases at the end of the month.

April to June 2022
 There were 90 new cases in April, bringing the total number of confirmed cases to 36,549. The death toll rose to 442. The number of recovered patients increased to 36,071, leaving 36 active cases at the end of the month.
 There were 253 new cases in May, bringing the total number of confirmed cases to 36,802. The death toll remained unchanged.
 There were 321 new cases in June, bringing the total number of confirmed cases to 37,123. The death toll rose to 443. The number of recovered patients increased to 36,450, leaving 130 active cases at the end of the month.

July to September 2022
 There were 344 new cases in July, bringing the total number of confirmed cases to 37,467. The death toll rose to 445.
 There were three new cases in August, bringing the total number of confirmed cases to 37,470. The death toll rose to 447.
 There were 588 new cases in September, bringing the total number of confirmed cases to 38,058. The death toll rose to 449.

October to December 2022
 Samples taken between May and October showed that the rapidly spreading BA.5.2.1.7 variant was present in Guinea.
 There were 95 new cases in October, bringing the total number of confirmed cases to 38,153. The death toll rose to 464. The number of recovered patients increased to 37,218, leaving 471 active cases at the end of the month.
 There were 23 new cases in November, bringing the total number of confirmed cases to 38,176. The death toll remained unchanged.
 There were 34 new cases in December, bringing the total number of confirmed cases to 38,210. The death toll rose to 466. The number of recovered patients remained at 37,218, leaving 526 active cases at the end of the month.

Statistics

Confirmed new cases per day

Confirmed deaths per day

See also 
 COVID-19 pandemic in Africa
 COVID-19 pandemic by country and territory

References

 
COVID-19 pandemic
COVID-19 pandemic
Guinea
Guinea
Disease outbreaks in Guinea